The 1976 Custom Credit Australian Indoor Championships was a men's professional tennis tournament played on indoor hard courts at the Hordern Pavilion in Sydney, Australia. It was the fourth edition of the tournament and was part of the 1976 Commercial Union Assurance Grand Prix circuit. The tournament was held from 18 October through 24 October 1976. Geoff Masters won the singles title.

Finals

Singles

 Geoff Masters defeated  James Delaney 4–6, 6–3, 7–6, 6–3
 It was Masters' 3rd title of the year and the 12th of his career.

Doubles

 Ismail El Shafei /  Brian Fairlie defeated  Syd Ball /  Kim Warwick 4–6, 6–4, 7–6
 It was El Shafei's only title of the year and the 5th of his career. It was Fairlie's 2nd title of the year and the 4th of his career.

References

External links
 ITF tournament edition details

 
Custom Credit Australian Indoor Championships
Australian Indoor Tennis Championships
In
Custom Credit Australian Indoor Championships
Sports competitions in Sydney
Tennis in New South Wales